Ultimate Cowboy Showdown is an American TV reality series, which aired in the United States on INSP and streaming platforms. It first aired in October 2019 and is hosted by Trace Adkins. The show has run for three seasons, with an announcement of a fourth to be filmed in 2022.

Premise
Each season contestants compete in a variety of areas, such as wrangling and sorting cattle, roping and horsemanship skills. In each episode, a contestant is eliminated from the competition. The winner receives a prize a package worth $50,000, including a herd of cattle.

Series
The first season aired in 2019 with six episodes. Jason Davis from Washington DC, Cuatro Houston and J Storme Jannise from Texas, Hadley Hunting from Wyoming, Jared Lee from Florida, Ethan Treadwell from Oklahoma, Derek Lacasa and Juan Carlos Villalpando from California, Cole Sandau from North Dakota, Tara Powers from Iowa, Cody Brewer from Tennessee and Zane Runyan from New Mexico competed for the title. Zane Runyan was crowned the winner of the first season.

In November 2019, the show was renewed for a second season, and premiered in February 2021. Season 2 was expanded to 10 episodes, with Colton Angel, Morgan Flitter, Hannah Castillitto, Lonnie Luke, Juan Carlos Montes, Roveskey Hickman, Ora Brown, Cole Wideman, Jackson Taylor, Jennifer Hudgins, Hunter Arnold Groveton, Tyler Kijac, JP Gonzalez and Katey Jo Gordon competing in this season. Katey Jo Gordon was crowned winner of season 2 in May 2021.

UCS Season 3 was greenlit in August 2021 and premiered on INSP in April 2022. The contestants for season 3 included Cody Anthony, Keaton Barger Chris Becker, Sal Campos, Buck Faust, Sara Foti, Stephen Heitman, Brianna Markum-McClain, Coy Melancon, Eddie Pena, Jim Smith, Cody Traylor, Jamon Turner, and Stephen Yellowtail. The overall winner for season 3 was Coy Melancon, with the final episode airing in June 2022.

External links
 Ultimate Cowboy Showdown website

References

2010s American reality television series
2020s American reality television series